John Glenn (1921–2016) was a U.S. Senator from Ohio from 1974 to 1999. Senator Glenn may also refer to:

Archibald A. Glenn (1819–1901), Illinois State Senate
Gene W. Glenn (born 1928), Iowa State Senate
Otis F. Glenn (1879–1959), U.S. Senator from Illinois from 1928 to 1933
Robert Broadnax Glenn (1854–1920), North Carolina State Senate
Robert Glenn (Wisconsin politician) (1858–1915), Wisconsin State Senate